Guillerval is a commune in the Essonne department in Île-de-France in northern France. Guillerval station has rail connections to Orléans, Étampes and Paris.

Inhabitants of Guillerval are known as Guillervallois.

See also
Communes of the Essonne department

References

External links

Mayors of Essonne Association 

Communes of Essonne